Voice – The Best of Beverley Knight is the first greatest hits album by British R&B recording artist and songwriter Beverley Knight, released in the United Kingdom on 20 March 2006 by Parlophone. The collection includes twelve UK Top 40 singles, including the newly recorded track and single "Piece of My Heart". The album also includes a second new track co-written with and produced by Chris Braide entitled "Who's Gonna Save Your Soul" and two live tracks.

"Piece of My Heart", a cover of the Erma Franklin and Janis Joplin hit, which Knight performed on her 2005 Affirmation Tour, preceded the release of the album on 13 March 2006.

The album was certified silver by the BPI on 31 March 2006, less than two weeks after its release. It was later certified gold at end of its fourth week of release by the BPI, on 21 April 2006. The album was certified as Knight's first platinum seller in 2007.

Track listing
"Shoulda Woulda Coulda"
"Keep This Fire Burning"
"Come as You Are"
"Piece of My Heart"
"Gold"
"Made It Back '99" (Good Times 7" Mix)
"Get Up!"
"Flavour of the Old School" (featuring Rapro)
"Sista Sista"
"Not Too Late for Love"
"Greatest Day" (Classic Mix)
"Made It Back" (featuring Redman)
"Sweet Thing" (Live on Radio 2)
"Angels" (with Guy Chambers) (Live on Radio 2)
"Who's Gonna Save Your Soul"

Charts

Weekly charts

Year-end charts

Certifications

References

2006 greatest hits albums
Beverley Knight albums
Parlophone compilation albums